Manivathoorile Aayiram Sivarathrikal (English: The 1000 Sivarathries of Manivathoor) is 1987 Malayalam film, starring Mammootty and directed by Fazil. It was the last film of the eminent music director M. B. Sreenivasan, who died less than a year after the film was released.

Plot
Thirteen-year-old Vineetha and her father, Dr. Vinayachandran go to visit her grandfather, John Samuel, in Ooty on the death anniversary of Vineetha's mother Neena, who died in a tragic accident. The movie flashes back to when Vinay meets Neena at a Church Service and falls in love. Both the families, despite belonging to different religions, give full consent to the couple to marry. After the wedding, Vinay takes Neena to his home back in Manivathoor to meet his mother (played by Sukhumari). Neena accidentally tips over the sacred deepam and it is seen as an omen against a long married life.

Cast
Mammootty as Dr. Vinayachandran 
Suhasini as Neena 
M. G. Soman as John Samuel 
Devan as Jose 
Sukumari as Vinayachandran's Mother 
Lizy as Rani
Adoor Bhasi as Neena's Uncle 
Jagadish as Neena's Cousin 
Anila as Vineetha

Soundtrack

Box office
The film was one of the biggest hits of 1987.

References

External links
 
 https://web.archive.org/web/20120407114909/http://popcorn.oneindia.in/title/5706/manivathoorile-aayiram-sivarathrikal.html

1980s Malayalam-language films
1987 romantic drama films
1987 films
Films scored by M. B. Sreenivasan
Indian romantic drama films